Murchison Independent School District is a public school district based in Murchison, Texas (USA).

Murchison ISD has one school that serves area students in grades Kindergarten through eight.

In 2009, the school district was rated "academically acceptable" by the Texas Education Agency.

References

External links
Murchison ISD

School districts in Henderson County, Texas